is a train station on the Kagoshima Main Line, operated by JR Kyushu located in Munakata, Fukuoka Prefecture, Japan.

Lines

Layout
The station consists of two side platforms serving two tracks. Two sidings branch off the main tracks.

Adjacent stations

History
The station was opened by Japanese Government Railways (JGR) on 1 April 1913 as an added station on the existing Kagoshima Main Line track. With the privatization of Japanese National Railways (JNR), the successor of JGR, on 1 April 1987, JR Kyushu took over control of the station.

Passenger statistics
In fiscal 2016, the station was used by an average of 5,158 passengers daily (boarding passengers only), and it ranked 38th among the busiest stations of JR Kyushu.

See also 
List of railway stations in Japan

References

External links
Tōgō (JR Kyushu)

Railway stations in Fukuoka Prefecture
Railway stations in Japan opened in 1913